Between Midnight and Dawn is a 1950 American film noir crime film directed by Gordon Douglas and starring Mark Stevens, Edmond O'Brien and Gale Storm.

Plot
Childhood friends Rocky Barnes (Stevens) and Dan Purvis (O'Brien) are Los Angeles prowl car cops on night duty. Barnes is easygoing while Purvis is a cynic who views all lawbreakers as scum. Both men are attracted to radio communicator Kate Mallory (Storm) but she is reluctant to get involved with policemen, her cop father having been killed in the line of duty.

One night Rocky and Dan arrest murderous racketeer Ritchie Garris (Buka) but he escapes and swears vengeance. In a thrill-packed climax, Garris makes a desperate escape using a little kid as a shield. After Garris' girlfriend (Robbins) is killed stepping in front of his gun, Purvis shoots Garris.

Cast
 Mark Stevens as Rocky Barnes
 Edmond O'Brien as Daniel Purvis	 
 Gale Storm as Katherine Mallory 
 Donald Buka as Ritchie Garris 
 Gale Robbins as Terry Romaine 
 Anthony Ross as Lt. Masterson 
 Roland Winters as Leo Cusick
 Tito Vuolo as Romano
 Grazia Narciso as Mrs. Romano 
 Madge Blake as Mrs. Mallory 
 Lora Lee Michel as Kathy

References

External links
 
 
 
 

1950 films
1950 crime films
American crime films
American black-and-white films
Film noir
Columbia Pictures films
Films scored by George Duning
Films set in Los Angeles
Films directed by Gordon Douglas
1950s English-language films
1950s American films